In medicine a Busch fracture  is a type of fracture of the base of the distal phalanx of the fingers, produced by the removal of the bone insertion (avulsion) of the extensor tendon. Without the appropriate treatment, the finger becomes a hammer finger. It would correspond to the group B of the Albertoni classification. It is very common in motorcycle riders and soccer joggers, caused by hyperflexion when the tendon is exercising its maximum tension (the closed hand tightening the clutch lever or the brake lever).

The Busch fracture is named after Friedrich Busch (1844–1916), who described this type of fracture in the 1860s. Busch's work was drawn on by Albert Hoffa in 1904, resulting in it sometimes being called a "Busch-Hoffa fracture".

The mechanism of this injury can be described as an avulsion of the tendon fixed to the distal phalanx.

See also
 Holdsworth fracture
 Galeazzi fracture

References

External links 

 worldcat-Friedrich Busch

Bone fractures